Judge Knox may refer to:

George Edward Knox (1845–1922), British Indian judge who worked in the high court of Allahabad
John C. Knox (New York judge) (1881–1966), judge of the United States District Court for the Southern District of New York
William W. Knox (1911–1981), judge of the United States District Court for the Western District of Pennsylvania

See also
Justice Knox (disambiguation)